The Allis-Chalmers model B was a small agricultural  tractor produced by the Allis-Chalmers Manufacturing company from 1937 to 1957. With over 125,000 units produced, the model B became one of the best selling and longest-produced tractors for Allis-Chalmers.  The B came in several different variations including the Asparagus B, Potato Special, and the IB industrial tractor, and gave rise to the larger Allis-Chalmers Model C. The Model B was styled by Brooks Stevens, an industrial designer and graphic designer.

Description and production 

Furthermore, the million or so tractors used on American farms were generally unsuitably large for such acreage. Although the Fordson tractor and then the first-generation row-crop tractors, including the Farmall, Allis-Chalmers's own Model WC, and others, had been gaining significant market penetration and making mechanised agriculture ever more popular, Merritt concluded that there was a need for four million small, inexpensive tractors to fill the needs of the small farmers still using horses.

In common with other tractors of the time, the Model B received a styled body, designed by industrial designer Brooks Stevens.

The Model B was initially powered by a Waukesha  four-cylinder engine, then from 1938 by an Allis-Chalmers  engine. The Model B was adapted for a variety of specialty crops, with variants including a high-clearance Asparagus Special and a narrow-track Potato Special. As a row-crop tractor the rear and wide front axles were adjustable. A standard tractor version, the IB, with fixed axles, was produced as an industrial tractor, often used as a mower.

A total of 120,783 Model Bs were built at Allis-Chalmers factories in West Allis, Wisconsin and in Southampton, England. Selling price in 1958 was about $1,500.

Model RC
The Model RC was adapted from the Allis-Chalmers Model WC as a two-plow row-crop tractor using Model B components. It was an expensive stopgap, and in 1939 the more powerful Allis-Chalmers Model C was introduced, based on the Model B, as a more efficient upgrade.

See also
List of Allis-Chalmers tractors
List of tractor manufacturers

References

The Allis Chalmers Story. C.H Wendel 
Antique Power Magazine July/August 1996
Allis Chalmers Model B, Antiquefarming.com

Allis-Chalmers tractors